Henry John Woodcock  (born 23 March 1967 in Taunton, England) is an Italian prosecutor currently based in Naples

Background and early life

Woodcock's father was British and worked as a teacher at Livorno's Naval Academy in northern Italy and his mother was from the southern Italian city of Naples.

Woodcock worked in Potenza for about ten years where he was a colleague of the former magistrate Luigi De Magistris, mayor of Naples until 2021, and they cooperated in anti-mafia investigations.

Some high-profile prosecutions

Woodcock became a prosecutor in 1996 and has become noted for his investigations in high-profile scandals including the Italian "Vip Gate" in 2003, and "Savoiagate" in 2006.

On 16 June 2006, Woodcock asked for, and obtained from the Judge of the preliminary investigation an arrest warrant against Vittorio Emanuele of Savoy in Varenna accusing him of participating in corruption, forgery, and organization of prostitution in relation to an investigation of the Casino of Campione d'Italia. The arrest was made after wire taps had been intercepted between Vittorio Emanuele and other suspects during a two-year investigation. Thirteen of 24 people investigated were arrested. Seven of these were jailed, while six were placed under house arrest. Among the other suspects were Salvatore Sottile, the spokesman of former foreign minister Gianfranco Fini and casino managers from Messina, Sicily.  Italian television also indicated that Vittorio's cousin Simeon II of Bulgaria, the last Tsar and former prime minister of Bulgaria, was under investigation. Vittor Emanuele was acquitted in Rome in 2010.

Woodcock moved to Naples in September 2009.

See also

 Luigi de Magistris (politician)#Famous investigations

References

1967 births
Living people
British emigrants to Italy
English people of Italian descent
Italian people of English descent
Italian prosecutors
People from Taunton